The Best Samba... Ever! is a compilation album released by EMI in 2006.

Track listing

CD 1
Elza Soares – "Mas que nada"
The Gimmicks – "Roda"
Marcos Valle – "Pepino Beach"
Joe Loss & His Orchestra – "Tequila"
Golden Boys – "Se Voce Quiser Mas Sem Bronquear"
Bebeto – "Flamengao"
Dean Martin – "Cha Cha D'amour"
Eduardo Araujo – "Rua Maluca"
Jackson Do Pandeiro – "Sebastiana"
Martinho da Vila – "Canta, Canta, Minha Gente"
Mandrake Som – "Berimbau"
Alaide Costa – "Catavento"
Wilson Das Neves E Seu Conjunto – "Brazzaville"
Wando – "Nega De Obaluae"
Sergent Garcia – "Dulce Con Chile"

CD 2
Sergent Garcia – "Si Yo Llegoyo, Yo Llego"
Bazeado – "Bazeado"
Elza Soares – "Chove Chuva"
Agora E Samba – "Tie"
Clarao Da Lua – "Selepentacao"
Tania Maria – "Madalena"
Airto Moreira – "It's Time for Carnival"
Verde Amarelo – "Vibrando Com A Selecao"
Conjunto Sal Da Terra – "Dingue Li Bangue"
Pontela – "Pai Bene, Queimou O Pe"
Caetane Veloso – "E Hoje"
Nelsinho & His Orchestra – "Ritmo"
Legendarios Do Brasil – "Viva Brasil (Ne Na Na)"
Monsueto – "Bateria E Solo De Percussao"

CD 3
Sinéad O'Connor – "How Insensitive"
Everything But The Girl – "Corcovado" (Quiet Nights Of Quiet Stars)
Ive Mendes – "Night Night (Craigie Remix)"
Doris Monteiro – "De Noite, Na Cama"
Clara Nunes – "Tristeza Pe No Chao"
Edu Lobo – "Viola Fora De Moda"
Eliana Pittman – "Vou Pular Neste Carnaval"
Joao Donato – "A Ra"
Luiz Melodia – "Ser Boemio"
Jurema – "Quisera Ser Eu"
Leila Pinheiro – "A Primeira Vez"
Lo Borges – "Tudo Que Voce Podia Ser"
Nana Caymmi – "Novo Amor"
Willie Bobo – "Trinidad"
Wilson Moreira & Nei Lopes – "Samba Do Iraja"/"Nao Foi Ela"
Orlandivo – "Tamanco No Samba"

CD 4
Martinho Da Vila – "Disritmia"
Astrud Gilberto & Joao Gilberto & Stan Getz – "The Girl From Ipanema"
Dick Farnay E Claudette Soares – "Voce"
Marlene – "Brigas, Nunca Mais"
Pery Ribeiro – "O Barquinho"
Legendarios Do Brasil – "Pais Tropical"
Silwia Telles – "So Em Teus Bracos"
Eliane Elias – "An Up Dawn"
Djavan – "Samba Dobrado"
Simone – "To Voltando"
Joyce E Gilson Peranzzetta – "A Felicidade"
Elis Regina & Adoniran Barbosa – "Tiro Ao Alvaro"
Wilson Simonal – "Telefone"
Meja – "Agua De Beber"
Leila Pinheiro – "Chega De Saudade"

Samba
Samba albums
2006 compilation albums